The 1961–63 Balkans Cup was the second Balkans Cup, a football competition for representative clubs from the Balkan states. It was contested by 8 teams and Olympiacos won the trophy.

Group A

Group B

Notes
Note 1: Fenerbahçe didn't show up.

Finals

|}

First leg

Second leg

Levski 1–1 Olympiacos on aggregate.

Play–off

Olympiacos won the play-off 1–0.

References

External links 
RSSSF Archive → Balkans Cup
 
 Mehmet Çelik. "Balkan Cup". Turkish Soccer

1961-63
1961–62 in European football
1962–63 in European football
1961–62 in Romanian football
1962–63 in Romanian football
1961–62 in Greek football
1962–63 in Greek football
1961–62 in Bulgarian football
1962–63 in Bulgarian football
1961–62 in Turkish football
1962–63 in Turkish football
1961–62 in Yugoslav football
1962–63 in Yugoslav football
1961 in Albanian football
1962–63 in Albanian football